Naomi is an unincorporated community and census-designated place (CDP) in Washington Township, Fayette County, Pennsylvania, United States. As of the 2010 census, the population was 69.

It is located in far northwestern Fayette County and is bordered by Fairhope to the east, Fayette City to the south, and Lynnwood to the north. The western border is the Monongahela River, which forms the Washington County line. Pennsylvania Routes 201 and 906 intersect in Naomi.

Demographics

References

Census-designated places in Fayette County, Pennsylvania
Census-designated places in Pennsylvania